David Amland (February 8, 1931 - February 28, 2010) was an American painter and art educator. He was a professor at Midland University in Nebraska, and later joined the art colony in Carmel, California. He retired in Texas. His work can be seen at the Museum of Nebraska Art.

References

1931 births
2010 deaths
Augustana University alumni
University of Iowa alumni
American art educators
American male painters
20th-century American male artists
20th-century American painters
21st-century American painters
21st-century American male artists